Seraphim Fred Post (August 1, 1904 – August 12, 1975) was an American football guard who played college football at Stanford University. He was a Consensus All-American in 1928. Stanford guard Don Robesky was also a consensus All-American in 1928. Post was a member of Stanford's 1927 Rose Bowl team.

References

1904 births
1975 deaths
American football guards
Stanford Cardinal football players
All-American college football players